Ümit Uygunsözlü (born 1986/1987) is a Turkish professional darts player.

Career
Uygunsözlü qualified for the 2017 BDO World Trophy by leading the Eastern European rankings thanks to winning the Turkish Open in 2016. He faced Scott Mitchell in the first round. Uygunsözlü lost a tight game 6–5. He maintained his form by reaching the last 8 of the Police Masters and Turkish Classic, enabling him to be the first person from Turkey to qualify for either of Darts World Championship.

World Championship results

BDO
 2018: Preliminary round (lost to Chris Harris 2–3)

References

External links
 Profile at Darts Database

Turkish darts players
Living people
British Darts Organisation players
1980 births